Cumberland County is a county in the Commonwealth of Pennsylvania. As of the 2020 census, the population was 259,469. Its county seat is Carlisle.

Cumberland County is included in the Harrisburg–Carlisle metropolitan statistical area.

History

Cumberland County was first settled by a majority of Scots-Irish immigrants who arrived in this area about 1730.  English and German settlers constituted about ten percent of the early population.  The settlers originally mostly devoted the area to farming and later developed other trades.  These settlers built the Middle Spring Presbyterian Church, among the oldest houses of worship in central Pennsylvania, in 1738 near present-day Shippensburg, Pennsylvania.

The General Assembly (legislature) of the Pennsylvania colony on January 27, 1750, created Cumberland County from Lancaster County, Pennsylvania, naming it for Cumberland, England. Its county seat is Carlisle.  The county also lies within the Cumberland Valley adjoining the Susquehanna River at its eastern border, stretching approximately 42 miles from the borough of Shippensburg on the west to the Susquehanna River in east Cumberland County.

The oldest towns in the county are Shippensburg and Carlisle, each with its unique history. Shippensburg is home to Shippensburg University of Pennsylvania, one of 14 universities of the Pennsylvania State System of Higher Education. Carlisle is also home to Dickinson College, established in 1773, and the Penn State Dickinson School of Law.

The United States Army War College is a United States Army school located in Carlisle, Pennsylvania, on the 500 acre (2 km2) campus of the historic Carlisle Barracks, a military post dating back to the 1770s.  It caters to high-level military personnel and civilians and prepares them for strategic leadership responsibilities.  It is the U. S. Army's most senior military educational institution.

During the Gettysburg campaign of the American Civil War in the summer of 1863, Confederate troops marched through the Cumberland Valley, briefly occupying much of Cumberland County.

In the 20th century, the suburbs of Harrisburg, the state capital, expanded extensively into eastern Cumberland County.  Carlisle also developed suburbs in adjoining townships.

Geography
The area code is 717 with an overlay of 223. Blue Mountain forms Cumberland's northern natural boundary and Yellow Breeches Creek forms part of its SE natural boundary. The Susquehanna River drains the county and forms its eastern natural boundary. A large portion of Cumberland is drained by the Conodoguinet Creek, which winds its way west-to-east across the county into the Susquehanna.

Climate
Almost all of Cumberland has a hot-summer humid continental climate (Dfa) and its hardiness zone is 6b, except in much of the eastern portion, where it is 7a. Average monthly temperatures in Lemoyne range from 29.9° F in January to 74.9° F in July, in Carlisle they range from 29.8° F in January to 75.2° F in July, and in Shippensburg they range from 29.6° F in January to 74.6° F in July.  The latest temperature averages show some low-lying eastern areas of the county to have a humid subtropical climate (Cfa.)

Adjacent counties
Perry County (north)
Dauphin County (east)
York County (southeast)
Adams County (south)
Franklin County (southwest)

Major highways

State protected areas
Colonel Denning State Park
Kings Gap Environmental Education and Training Center
Pine Grove Furnace State Park

Demographics

As of the census of 2000, there were 213,674 people, 83,015 households, and 56,118 families residing in the county.  The population density was 388 people per square mile (150/km2).  There were 86,951 housing units at an average density of 158 per square mile (61/km2).  The racial makeup of the county was 94.40% White, 2.36% Black or African American, 0.13% Native American, 1.67% Asian, 0.04% Pacific Islander, 0.43% from other races, and 0.97% from two or more races.  1.35% of the population were Hispanic or Latino of any race. 35.3% were of German, 10.6% American, 10.1% Irish, 7.5% English and 6.8% Italian ancestry. 94.7% spoke English and 1.4% Spanish as their first language.

There were 83,015 households, out of which 29.50% had children under the age of 18 living with them, 56.50% were married couples living together, 8.00% had a female householder with no husband present, and 32.40% were non-families. 26.70% of all households were made up of individuals, and 10.30% had someone living alone who was 65 years of age or older.  The average household size was 2.41 and the average family size was 2.92.

In the county, the population was spread out, with 22.00% under the age of 18, 10.60% from 18 to 24, 28.50% from 25 to 44, 24.10% from 45 to 64, and 14.90% who were 65 years of age or older.  The median age was 38 years. For every 100 females, there were 95.20 males.  For every 100 females age 18 and over, there were 92.70 males.

Its per capita income is $31,627, making it the wealthiest Pennsylvania county outside greater Philadelphia, and fifth wealthiest overall.

2020 Census

Metropolitan Statistical Area
The United States Office of Management and Budget has designated Cumberland County as the Harrisburg-Carlisle, PA Metropolitan Statistical Area (MSA).  As of the 2010 U.S. Census the metropolitan area ranked 6th most populous in the State of Pennsylvania and the 96th most populous in the United States with a population of 549,475.  Cumberland County is also a part of the larger Harrisburg–York–Lebanon combined statistical area (CSA), which combines the populations of Cumberland County as well as Adams, Dauphin, Lebanon, Perry and York Counties in Pennsylvania.  The Combined Statistical Area ranked 5th in the State of Pennsylvania and 43rd most populous in the United States with a population of 1,219,422.

Government and politics
Cumberland County has been a Republican Party stronghold in presidential contests since McKinley’s election in 1896, with only five Democratic Party candidates winning the county. The most recent Democrat to win the county in a presidential election was Lyndon B. Johnson in 1964 who won in a landslide statewide & nationally.  Barack Obama in 2008 and Joe Biden in 2020 are the lone Democrats to win forty percent of the county's votes since Johnson's 1964 win.

|}

As of January 17, 2023, there are 174,728 registered voters in Cumberland County.

 Republican: 86,431 (49.5%)
 Democratic: 59,795 (34.2%)
 Independent: 21,054 (12%)
 Third Parties: 7,448 (4.3%)

The Republican Party has been dominant in Cumberland County politics since the 1890s, with the victories of Robert P. Casey for governor in 1990, Bob Casey Jr. for state treasurer in 2004, Tom Wolf for governor in 2018, and Josh Shapiro for governor in 2022 being among the few times where a statewide Democrat carried the county. The county commissioner majority, all row offices, and all legislative seats serving Cumberland are held by Republicans.

County commissioners
Vince DiFilippo, Republican
Jean Foschi, Democrat
Gary Eichelberger, Chairman, Republican

Other county offices
Clerk of Courts, Dennis Lebo, Republican
Controller, Alfred Whitcomb, Republican
Coroner Charles Hall, Republican
District Attorney, Seán M. McCormack, Republican
Prothonotary, Dale Sabadish, Republican
Recorder of Deeds, Tammy L. Shearer, Republican
Register of Wills, Lisa M. Grayson, Esq., Republican
Sheriff, Jody Smith, Republican
Treasurer, Kelly Neiderer, Republican

State Representatives
Thomas Kutz, Republican, 87th district
Sheryl M. Delozier, Republican, 88th district
Patty Kim, Democrat, 103rd district
Torren C. Ecker, Republican, 193rd district
Barbara Gleim, Republican, 199th district

State Senators
Judy Ward, Republican, 30th district
Mike Regan, Republican, 31st district
Doug Mastriano, Republican, 33rd district

United States House of Representatives
Scott Perry, Republican, 10th district
John Joyce, Republican, 13th district

United States Senate
 John Fetterman, Democratic
 Bob Casey, Democratic

Education

Colleges and universities
Central Pennsylvania College
Dickinson College
Messiah College
Penn State Dickinson Law
Shippensburg University of Pennsylvania
U.S. Army War College

Community, junior and technical colleges
ITT Technical Institute

Public school districts

 Big Spring School District
 Camp Hill School District
 Carlisle Area School District
 Cumberland Valley School District
 East Pennsboro Area School District
 Mechanicsburg Area School District
 Shippensburg Area School District (also in Franklin County)
 South Middleton School District
 West Shore School District (also in York County)

Public charter schools
Commonwealth Connections Academy Charter School - Mechanicsburg

Technical school
Cumberland-Perry Area Vocational Technical School

Private schools
As reported by the National Center for Educational Statistics

Allen Mennonite School - Dillsburg
Berean Christian Day School - Newville
Best Friends - New Cumberland
Bethel Christian Academy - Carlisle
Blue Ridge Mennonite School - Carlisle
Brookside Montessori School - Camp Hill
Chesterbrook Academy - Camp Hill
Chestnut Groove School - Shippensburg
Children's School of New Cumberland - New Cumberland
Dickinson College Children's Center - Carlisle
Emmanuel Baptist Christian Academy - Mechanicsburg
Faith Tabernacle School - Mechanicsburg
Good Shepherd Elementary School - Camp Hill
Harrisburg Academy - Wormleysburg
Hickory Lane School - Newburg
Hidden Valley School - Carlisle
Kindercare Learning Center - Mechanicsburg
Learning and Sharing - New Cumberland
Logos School - Carlisle
Living Faith School - Shippensburg
Meadow Run - Newburg
Mechanicsburg Learning Center - Mechanicsburg
Middle Run Parochial School - Shippensburg
Oak Grove Parochial School - Shippensburg
Oakwood Baptist Day School - Camp Hill
Otterbein School - Newburg
Quarry Hill School - Newville
Rocky View School Parochial - Newville
South Mountain Parochial School - Shippensburg
South Mountain Parochial School - Newville
Spring HIll Parochial School - Shipensburg
St. Joseph School - Mechaniscburg
St Patrick School - Carlisle
St Theresa Elementary School - New Cumberland
Sunset Amish School - Newburg
The Children's Garden of St Johns Lutheran Church - Shiremanstown
The Christian School of Grace Baptist Church - Carlisle
The Goddard School - Enola
The Goddard School - Mechanicsburg
The Learning Center - Camp Hill
Trinity High School (Camp Hill, Pennsylvania)
West Shore Christian Academy - Shiremanstown
Yellow Breeches Education Center - Boiling Springs

Public libraries
 Cumberland County Library System
 Amelia S. Givin Free Library
 Bosler Memorial Library
 East Pennsboro Branch Library
 Cleve J. Fredricksen Public Library
 John Graham Public Library
 New Cumberland Public Library
 Shippensburg Public Library
 Joseph T. Simpson Public Library

Communities

Under Pennsylvania law, there are four types of incorporated municipalities: cities, boroughs, townships, and, in at most two cases, towns. The following boroughs and townships are located in Cumberland County:

Boroughs
Camp Hill
Carlisle (county seat)
Lemoyne
Mechanicsburg
Mount Holly Springs
New Cumberland
Newburg
Newville
Shippensburg (partly in Franklin County)
Shiremanstown
Wormleysburg

Townships

Cooke
Dickinson
East Pennsboro
Hampden
Hopewell
Lower Allen
Lower Frankford
Lower Mifflin
Middlesex
Monroe
North Middleton
North Newton
Penn
Shippensburg
Silver Spring
South Middleton
South Newton
Southampton
Upper Allen
Upper Frankford
Upper Mifflin
West Pennsboro

Census-designated places
Census-designated places are geographical areas designated by the U.S. Census Bureau for the purposes of compiling demographic data. They are not actual jurisdictions under Pennsylvania law. Other unincorporated communities, such as villages, may be listed here as well.

Boiling Springs
Carlisle Barracks
Enola
Lower Allen
Messiah College
New Kingstown
Plainfield
Schlusser
Shippensburg University
West Fairview

Unincorporated communities
 Bloserville
 Grantham
 Hogestown
 Huntsdale
 Lisburn
 Summerdale
 West Hill

Population ranking
The population ranking of the following table is based on the 2010 census of Cumberland County.

† county seat

Recreation
Annual events occur in downtown Carlisle at the Carlisle Fairgrounds. The Capital City Mall in Lower Allen Township serves the West Shore, the Carlisle area, and surrounding communities. Williams Grove Speedway is a half-mile auto-racing track in the county. The Appalachian Trail crosses the central part of Cumberland, which has two state parks:
Colonel Denning State Park (also in Perry County)
Pine Grove Furnace State Park (also in Adams County)

See also
National Register of Historic Places listings in Cumberland County, Pennsylvania

References

External links

County of Cumberland (official website)
Cumberland Area Economic Development Corporation
Carlisle Young Professionals
Cumberland Valley Visitors Bureau

 
1750 establishments in Pennsylvania
Harrisburg–Carlisle metropolitan statistical area
Populated places established in 1750